Journal of Song-Yuan Studies, known as Journal of Sung-Yuan Studies from 1990 to 2000, Bulletin of Sung-Yuan Studies from 1978 to 1989, and Sung Studies Newsletter from 1970 to 1977, is an American academic journal on "middle imperial Chinese history" or Chinese history from the 10th to 14th centuries, specifically the Five Dynasties period, Liao dynasty, Song dynasty, Western Xia, Jin dynasty (1115–1234), and Yuan dynasty.

External links
Official site

See also
Late Imperial China (journal)

Publications established in 1970
Chinese history journals
English-language journals